The 2019 Southern Utah Thunderbirds football team represented Southern Utah University in the 2019 NCAA Division I FCS football season. They were led by fourth-year head coach Demario Warren and played their home games at Eccles Coliseum in Cedar City, Utah as eighth-year members of the Big Sky Conference. They finished the season 3–9, 2–6 in Big Sky play to finish in a five-way tie for ninth place.

Previous season 

The Thunderbirds finished the 2018 season 1–10, 1–7 in Big Sky play to finish in 12th place.

Preseason

Big Sky preseason poll
The Big Sky released their preseason media and coaches' polls on July 15, 2019. The Thunderbirds were picked to finish in eleventh place by the media and in twelfth by the coaches.

Preseason All–Big Sky team
The Thunderbirds had one player selected to the preseason all-Big Sky team.

Offense

Zach Larsen – C

Schedule

 Source:

Game summaries

at UNLV

at Northern Iowa

Stephen F. Austin

at South Dakota State

Cal Poly

at Portland State

at Weber State

UC Davis

Idaho State

at Montana State

Northern Arizona

at North Dakota

References

Southern Utah
Southern Utah Thunderbirds football seasons
Southern Utah Thunderbirds football